Doug Mowat is a set decorator.

He was nominated for an Academy Award during the 83rd Academy Awards for the film Inception in the category of Best Art Direction. He shared his nomination with Guy Hendrix Dyas and Larry Dias. He graduated from the AFI Conservatory in 1984.

References

External links

Living people
AFI Conservatory alumni
Best Production Design BAFTA Award winners
Set decorators
Year of birth missing (living people)